Paz Lenchantin (born December 12, 1973) is an Argentine-American musician, best known as the current bass guitarist and backing vocalist of the alternative rock band Pixies. Lenchantin joined the band in 2014, following the departure of founding member Kim Deal, and has recorded four studio albums with the band, to date.

Prior to joining Pixies, Lenchantin was a member of Entrance, A Perfect Circle, Silver Jews and Zwan.

Early life
Lenchantin, who is of Armenian, French and Argentine ancestry, moved to Los Angeles, California, with her family at the age of four. Her father is classical pianist Mario Merdirossian who has been a professor of piano at National University of Buenos Aires-Tandil, University of Mississippi, the Catholic University of Lima, Peru. She speaks fluent Spanish and English. She began playing piano at age five. She then took violin lessons at age eight and taught herself how to play guitar at age 12. Her sister Ana Lenchantin is a musician and a frequent collaborator. She also frequently collaborated with her brother Luciano Lenchantin before his death in 2003. In the '90s, Paz was a piano teacher, a music programmer for video games, and a sound composer for the Sci-Fi Channel.

Musical career 
Lenchantin joined Billy Howerdel, Josh Freese, Troy Van Leeuwen, and Maynard James Keenan in the band A Perfect Circle. She contributed to their albums, Mer de Noms and Thirteenth Step. Lenchantin later left the group to join with Billy Corgan, Jimmy Chamberlin, Matt Sweeney, and David Pajo in the band Zwan. In 2002, Lenchantin, Melissa Auf der Maur (Smashing Pumpkins and Hole), Samantha Maloney, and Radio Sloan (The Need) created a new band called The Chelsea. The all-female supergroup played only one show on February 2, 2002 before going their separate ways. An audience recording of said show was later bootlegged. Lenchantin returned to play strings and piano with A Perfect Circle in recording their cover album eMOTIVe, released November 2, 2004 and debuting at #2 on the Billboard 200. She also contributed a solo cover of the song "The Hollow" to A Perfect Circle's CD/DVD release, aMOTION. Since 2005, Lenchantin has been collaborating with The Entrance Band on their album Prayer of Death, as co- producer as well as contributing bass and violin. She also appeared on the previous Entrance album Wandering Stranger (2004). She is now a seemingly permanent member of the Entrance Band.
Since 2012 winter, Paz has been touring with Josephine Foster supporting the "Blood Rushing" album promotion. In December 2013, Lenchantin was announced as the new touring bassist for Pixies, in replacement of founding band member Kim Deal and touring bassist Kim Shattuck, for their 2014 tour. In July 2016, Lenchantin confirmed that she is now a full-time member of Pixies.

Other appearances 
Lenchantin also played strings on a song on the Queens of the Stone Age's album, Songs for the Deaf. She has played with David Pajo in Papa M, and contributed fiddle on the Silver Jews record, Tanglewood Numbers. She has toured with RTX/Jennifer Herrema of Royal Trux. In 2002, she performed on Trust Company's album The Lonely Position Of Neutral. In 2005 she played violin on the Kaura track "Dividing Lines". She has also contributed to and toured with Jarboe of Swans. In 2000, she appeared in A Perfect Circle's "Judith" music video as bassist. Lenchantin also played bass on Brightblack Morning Light's 2006 self-titled album on Matador Records. She worked with director Michael Mann on his film Miami Vice contributing violin on several scenes. She contributed playing strings on Melissa Auf der Maur's first solo album Auf der Maur. In 2008, Paz co-wrote the Ashes Divide song "Denial Waits", and she played violin on Jenny Lewis' second studio album Acid Tongue. She appeared on Into The Presence's 2009 album, playing the bass.

Discography

With A Perfect Circle
Mer de Noms (2000) (Strings, bass on "Sleeping Beauty", backing vocals on "Judith")
Thirteenth Step (2003) (Strings on "Gravity")
eMOTIVe (2004) (Piano, strings)
Amotion (2004) (Acoustic guitar, piano, strings)

With Pixies
Indie Cindy (2014) (Bass on all Deluxe edition live tracks, vocals and bass on vinyl exclusive track "Women of War")
Head Carrier (2016) (Bass, backing vocals, lead vocals on "All I Think About Now") 
Beneath the Eyrie (2019) (Bass, backing vocals, lead vocal on "Los Surfers Muertos")
Doggerel (2022) (Bass, backing vocals, keyboards)

With Ashes Divide
Keep Telling Myself It's Alright (2008) (Co-writing on "Denial Waits")

With Brightblack Morning Light
Brightblack Morning Light (2006) (Bass, piano)

With Entrance
Wandering Stranger (2004)
Prayer of Death (2006) (Bass Guitar; co-producer; violin; vocals)
The Entrance Band (2009) (Bass)
Fine Flow (2012) (Bass)

With Jenny Lewis
Acid Tongue (2008) (Violin on "Black Sand")

With Josephine Foster
Blood Rushing (2012) (Indian flute, bass, violin, vocals)

With Kaura
Kaura EP (2005) (Violin on "Dividing Lines")

With Melissa Auf der Maur
Auf der Maur (2004) (Strings)

With Queen Adreena
Pretty Like Drugs (2002) (Violin on "Beneath the Skin")

With Queens of the Stone Age
Songs for the Deaf (2002) (Strings on "Mosquito Song")

With Silver Jews
Tanglewood Numbers (2005) (Fiddle)

With Trust Company
The Lonely Position of Neutral (2002) (Strings, piano on "Hover (Alternate Version)")

With Zwan
Mary Star of the Sea (2003) (Bass)

With Jarboe
The Men Album (2005) (Bass on "Feral" and vocals / strings on "A Woman's Dreams")

Solo discography
Lenchantin has produced two solo albums, both of which were made available through her MySpace page.

 Yellow mY skYcaptain (2000)
 Songs for Luci (2006)

References 

1973 births
Living people
A Perfect Circle members
Argentine emigrants to the United States
Argentine people of French descent
Argentine people of Armenian descent
Argentine bass guitarists
Argentine rock musicians
American rock musicians
Women bass guitarists
Women rock singers
Hispanic and Latino American musicians
People from Mar del Plata
American rock violinists
Zwan members
Alternative metal bass guitarists
Pixies (band) members
Alternative rock bass guitarists
Silver Jews members
21st-century American singers
21st-century American women singers
21st-century American bass guitarists
21st-century American violinists